Phyllocharis ewani is a species of leaf beetle belonging to the family Chrysomelidae.

Distribution
This species is native to Southeast Asia.

References

 Phyllocharis ewani Reid, C.A.M. 2006. A taxonomic revision of the Australian Chrysomelinae, with a key to the genera (Coleoptera: Chrysomelidae). Zootaxa 1292: 1-119 [91] [replacement name for Phyllocharis abdominalis Jacoby, 1894].
 Phyllocharis abdominalis Jacoby, M. 1894. Descriptions of new genera and species of phytophagous Coleoptera obtained by W. Doherty in the Malayan Archipelago. Novitates Zoologicae 1(2): 267–330 [Apr. 1894] [286] [junior homonym of Phyllocharis abdominalis Baly, 1867].

Chrysomelinae
Beetles described in 2006